Appozai is town and union council of Zhob District in the Balochistan province of Pakistan. The capital of the district, Zhob, was originally known as Appozai.

References

Populated places in Zhob District
Union councils of Balochistan, Pakistan